The 50th Network Operations Group (50 NOG) was a United States Air Force group assigned to the 50th Space Wing at Schriever Air Force Base, Colorado. 50 NOG operated the Air Force Satellite Control Network and was responsible for the 50th Space Wing's cyber and communications systems.

In December 2019, the United States Space Force was established and numbers of Air Force personnel were re-assigned to the Space Force, without transferring to the new service. The group's functions were to be taken over by the Space Force, and on 24 July 2020 it was redesignated as Space Force's Space Delta 6.

History
The group was first organized as the 1879th Communications Squadron during the Vietnam War in 1965. In 1971, as American participation in the Vietnam War was reduced and United States Air Force closed down its activities at Nha Trang Air Base, the squadron was moved to Richards-Gebaur Air Force Base, Missouri, where it absorbed the mission, personnel and equipment of the 2009th Communications Squadron, which was inactivated.

The unit moved to its present location, then named Falcon Air Force Station, when Richards-Gebaur was turned over to the Air Force Reserve.  The 1879th assumed the resources of the 2184th Communications Squadron at Falcon.  When the 2d Space Wing was inactivated in 1992 the 1879th was inactivated with it and its mission was taken over by the 50th Satellite Communications Squadron.

The expanded space communications mission at Schriever Air Force Base led to the activation of the unit, now designated the 50th Communications Group.  In 2002 the group was inactivated and its components transferred to the 50th Maintenance Group.  This action was reversed less than a year later.  The group received its last designation in March 2004.

Structure in 2020
 21st Space Operations Squadron (21 SOPS), Vandenberg Air Force Base
Detachment 1, 21st Space Operations Squadron, Naval Support Facility Diego Garcia
Detachment 2, 21st Space Operations Squadron, Andersen Air Force Base
Detachment 3, 21st Space Operations Squadron, Kaena Point Satellite Tracking Station
 22nd Space Operations Squadron (22 SOPS)
 23rd Space Operations Squadron (23 SOPS), New Boston Air Force Station
Detachment 1, 23rd Space Operations Squadron, Thule Air Base
OL-A, 23rd Space Operations Squadron, RAF Oakhanger
 50th Space Communications Squadron (50 SCS)

Lineage
 Designated 1879th Communications Squadron and organized on 1 November 1965
 Redesignated 1879th Information Systems Squadron on 1 July 1985
 Redesignated 1879th Communications Squadron on 1 November 1986
 Redesignated 1879th Communications Group on 1 October 1989
 Inactivated 30 January 1992
 Redesignated 50th Communications Group on 26 November 1997
 Activated 1 December 1997
 Inactivated 1 October 2002
 Activated 1 June 2003
 Redesignated 50th Network Operations Group on 10 March 2004
Redesignated as Space Delta 6 on 24 July 2020

Assignments
 1964th Communications Group, 1 November 1965
 Northern Communications Area, 1 September 1971
 Airlift Communications Division, 1 June 1981
 Tactical Communications Division (later, Tactical Information Systems Division), 1 October 1982
 Space Communications Division (later Space Information Systems Division, Space Communications Division), 1 October 1984
 2d Space Wing, 1 October 1990 – 30 January 1992
 50th Space Wing, 1 December 1997 – 1 October 2002
 50th Space Wing, 1 June 2003 – 2020

Stations
 Nha Trang Airport (later Nha Trang Air Base), South Vietnam, 1 November 1965
 Richards-Gebaur Air Force Base, Missouri, 1 September 1971
 Falcon Air Force Station (later Falcon Air Force Base), Colorado, 1 October 1984 – 30 January 1992
 Falcon Air Force Base (later Schriever Air Force Base), Colorado, 1 December 1997 – 1 October 2002
 Schriever Air Force Base, Colorado, 1 June 2003 – 2020

Honors and campaigns
Campaign streamers
Vietnam:
 Vietnam Defensive 1965–1966
 Vietnam Air 1966
 Vietnam Air Offensive 1966–1967
 Vietnam Air Offensive, Phase II 1967–1968
 Vietnam Air/Ground 1968
 Vietnam Air Offensive, Phase III 1968
 Vietnam Air Offensive, Phase IV 1968–1969
 Tet 69/Counteroffensive 1969
 Vietnam Summer/Fall 1969
 Vietnam Winter/Spring 1969–1970
 Sanctuary Counteroffensive 1970
 Southwest Monsoon 1970
 Commando Hunt V 1970–1971
 Commando Hunt VI 1971

Decorations
 Vietnam Presidential Unit Citation: 21 June 1968 – 30 June 1969

 Republic of Vietnam Gallantry Cross with Palm: 1 April 1966 – 1 September 1971; 1 January  – 30 August 1968

 Air Force Outstanding Unit Awards with Combat "V" Device: 1 July 1965 – 30 June 1966; 1 July 1966 – 30 June 1967; 1 July 1967 – 30 June 1968; 1 July 1968 – 30 June 1969; 1 July 1969 – 30 June 1970; 1 July 1970 – 30 June 1971; 1 July 1971 – 1 August 1971

 Air Force Outstanding Unit Awards: 1 September 1971 – 15 April 1972; 1 January 1976 – 31 December 1976; 1 September 1990 – 31 August 1991; 1 October 1998 – 30 September 2000; 1 October 2000 – 1 October 2001; 1 October 2001 – 1 October 2002; 2 October 2002 – 1 October 2003

Other awards
 Major General Harold M. McClelland Award
 2007
 2008
 2009 (14th Air Force level)

Commanders 

 Unknown, 1 November 1965 – 1 October 1985
 Lt Col Robert W. Alexander, 1 October 1985 – 18 July 1988
 Col William A. Sample, 19 July 1988 – 1 August 1990
 Lt Col Roman Synychak, 2 August 1990 – 30 January 1992
 Col Gregory S. Hollister, 1 December 1997 – 24 March 1998
 Col Paul F. Capasso, 25 March 1998 – 13 April 2000
 Col David B. Warner, 14 April 2000 – 27 June 2002
 Col Earl D. Matthews, 28 June 2002 – 13 June 2004
 Col David C. Uhrich, 14 June 2004 – 10 July 2006
 Col Robert J. Skinner, 10 July 2006 – 13 July 2008
 Col Mitchel Butikofer, 14 July 2008 – 14 May 2010
 Col Michael Finn II, 14 May 2010 – 4 April 2012
 Col Jonathan Sutherland, 4 April 2012 – 2 June 2014
 Col Jason Sutton, 2 June 2014 – 23 June 2016
 Col W. Scott Angerman, 23 June 2016 – 29 June 2018
 Col Hewett Wells, 29 June 2018 – 16 June 2020
 Col Roy V. Rockwell, 16 June 2020 – 24 July 2020

References

050
Military units and formations disestablished in 2020